Dalamar the Dark is a fantasy novel by Nancy Varian Berberick, set in the world of Dragonlance, and based on the Dungeons & Dragons role-playing game. It is the second novel in the "Dragonlance Classics" series. It was published in paperback in January 2000.

Plot summary

Dalamar the Dark is a novel that tells the story of Dalamar the elf wizard.

Reception

2000 novels
Dragonlance novels